After an early flirtation with V-twin engines, Mazda's small cars of the 1960s were powered by OHV straight-2 and straight-4 engines. This family lasted from 1961 until the mid-1970s.  Today, Mazda's keicars use Suzuki engines. It was produced at the Hiroshima Plant in Hiroshima, Japan.

AA

The engine was a two-stroke, water-cooled straight-2 engine used in the Mazda Chantez and Mazda Porter kei car and truck unique to Japan from 1972 - 1976.

DA/DB

The  water-cooled OHV straight-4 DA engine, used in the 1962 P360 Carol had a tiny  bore and stroke. This was one of the smallest production four-cylinder automobile engines in history, only beaten by Honda's  I4 unit used in the T360 truck. Mazda's tiny OHV was the only four-cylinder in the class in the 1960s, but was outperformed by 2-stroke and I3 powerplants from other companies.

When fitted to the B360/Porter light truck and van, the engine received the DB engine code.

RA
The  RA engine was a larger version of the  engine .

SA
The SA, a larger  engine powered the 1963-1967 Mazda Familia and the 1966 Mazda Bongo.

PB
The  PB engine, a separate development, used a square  bore and stroke. It was a water-cooled OHV engine and first powered the 1967 Mazda Familia 1000.

 Jan 1967 - Feb 1968 Mazda Familia 1000 Sedan, Van (Mazda 1000)
 Nov 1967 - 1973 Mazda Familia 1000 (Mazda 1000)

TB
One of the more-popular variants of this family was the  TB unit found in the Familia/1200. This engine was built from 1968 until 1970 for passenger cars, until 1971 for the Familia Truck.

UA/UB
The UA (and the similar UB, for use in three-wheeled trucks) is a 1484 cc water-cooled overhead valve inline-four engine.

UA:
March 1960 – 1965:  (DUA12)
1961-1965: Mazda B1500 (BUA/BUB)
1965-1971: Mazda B1500/Proceed (BUD61)
1965-1977:  DUD9/DUE9

UB:
1962-1971:

VA
The VA first appeared in the Mazda D2000 of April 1962. Power output was originally  at 4600 rpm, but later models have  at 5000 rpm.

 April 1962 - 1964 Mazda D2000, D2000 Microbus (DVA12)
 1964 - 1973 Mazda Light Bus (AEVA)
 January 1964 - 1971 Mazda E2000 (EVA12/32)
 Mazda Parkway 18 (EVK15)
 1971 - 197? Mazda Titan (EVB12)
 1973 - 197? Mazda Parkway 26 (AEVB)

See also
 Mazda engines
 Mazda Wankel engine

References

OHV
Straight-twin engines
Straight-four engines
Gasoline engines by model